Chibuike Ohizu (born 18 September 1996) is a Nigerian professional footballer who plays as a forward for South African Premier Division club Sekhukhune United.

Career
Born in Onitsha, Ohizu played for Nigeria National League club Inter FC Enugu before moving to Kempton Park, South Africa and was recruited to the Future of Africa Academy by Abayomi Adebayo in 2015. In 2016, he signed for Gauteng-based SAFA Second Division side Leruma United. He joined Jomo Cosmos in 2018 after playing in a friendly match against them. Ohizu joined Sekhukhune United on loan during the 2020–21 season and joined the club permanently after they won the National First Division and were promoted to the South African Premier Division at the end of the season.

Honours
Sekhukhune United
National First Division: 2020–21
Source:

References

External links

1996 births
Living people
Sportspeople from Onitsha
Nigerian footballers
Association football forwards
Jomo Cosmos F.C. players
Sekhukhune United F.C. players
SAFA Second Division players
National First Division players
South African Premier Division players
Nigerian expatriate footballers
Nigerian expatriate sportspeople in South Africa
Expatriate soccer players in South Africa